The 1931 Fareham by-election was held on 20 February 1931.  The by-election was held due to the resignation of the incumbent Conservative MP, John Davidson.  It was won by the Conservative candidate Thomas Inskip.

References

Fareham by-election
Fareham by-election
20th century in Hampshire
Fareham by-election
Politics of the Borough of Fareham
By-elections to the Parliament of the United Kingdom in Hampshire constituencies